The Victorian Railways G class was a class of  light line passenger locomotives operated by the Victorian Railways between 1877 and 1904.

History
Numbered 38 and 44, numbers vacated by two withdrawn Geelong and Melbourne Railway Company engines. Classed 'G' in 1886.

Production
Built by the Williamstown Workshops in 1877. Design was similar to the 1874 K class in both power and weight. The four-wheel bogie instead of a fixed axle at the front reduced the maximum wheel load a little and improved lateral stability. All Meikle engines had been fitted with almost standard four-wheeled tenders, differing only in minor details, but this new design had a wheelbase of 8 feet compared with 7 feet and had a larger capacity.

Regular service
Based at Castlemaine in the 1890s presumably for the Maldon line.

Design improvements
Both reboilering in 1882. No.38 fitted with an extended smokebox.

Accidents

Withdrawal
Both the locomotives were scrapped in 1904.

Fleet summary

Model Railways

References

Specific

4-4-0 locomotives
Railway locomotives introduced in 1877
Victorian Railways G class steam (1877)
Victorian Railways G class steam (1877)
G class steam (1877)
Williamstown Workshops locomotives